The Greenbrier Valley Ranger is a newspaper serving Lewisburg and surrounding Greenbrier County in the U.S. state of West Virginia. Published weekly, it has a circulation of  24,053 and is owned, along with the West Virginia Daily News, by Greenbrier Daily Newspapers, Inc.

See also
 List of newspapers in West Virginia

References

External links 
 Official web site

Newspapers published in West Virginia
Greenbrier County, West Virginia